Morrosaurus is an extinct genus of herbivorous ornithopod dinosaur member of the Elasmaria, that lived in the late Cretaceous in the Antarctica. The only known species is the type Morrosaurus antarcticus.

Discovery 
In 2002 the Argentine paleontologist Fernando Novas reported the discovery of a partial skeleton of a euornithopod in Antarctica. In 2016 these remains were the basis for naming the type species Morrosaurus antarcticus, named and described by Sebastian Rozadilla, Federico Lisandro Agnolin, Fernando Emilio Novas, Alexis Rolando Aranciaga Mauro, Matthew J. Motta, Juan Manuel Lirio Marcelo, and Pablo Isasi. The genus name refers to the site of El Morro on James Ross Island, where the remains of the species were found. The specific name refers to Antarctica.

The holotype specimen MACN Pv 197, was found in a layer of the Snow Hill Island Formation (Cape Lambe, previously assigned to the Lopez de Bertodano Formation), dating to the Maastrichtian age. The remains consists in a right hind leg, including the top of the femur, the lower end of the femur, the upper part of the tibia, the underside of the tibia, the upper half of the foot, the bottom of the midfoot and the top of the first joint of the third toe.

Description 
The type specimen corresponds to a medium-sized animal. The descriptors were able to establish some distinctive features. Two of these are autapomorphies, i.e. derived features that are unique. In bottom view, the greater trochanter of the femur has an undulating profile with a thick edge output and a main thin edge. The fourth metatarsal bone has a triangular profile with a rearward projection that wraps around it and the third metatarsal.

In addition, there is a unique combination of two features that by themselves are not unique features. In the femur, the lesser trochanter is inclined diagonally, right next to the greater trochanter. In the tibia, medial malleolus has a triangular outline view showing a front concave surface.

Phylogeny 
Morrosaurus was classified in the group Iguanodontia, as a basal member of Euiguanodontia. This in turn formed a clade with other ornithopods of Patagonia and Antarctica, particularly Trinisaura, Gasparinisaura, Anabisetia, Notohypsilophodon, Talenkauen and Macrogryphosaurus in a group called Elasmaria, whose members are distinguished by their adaptation to a running lifestyle which would be reflected by the narrow foot with a thin fourth metatarsal which indicates a high speed running; subsequently expanded chevrons, a feature that is associated with a greater surface area for attachment of the lateral muscles of the tail, which would give good control of the movements of this; and a curved humerus which demonstrates the absence of a deltopectoral ridge and therefore that the front leg was not used for walking. It cannot be determined, however, if Morrosaurus itself possessed these characteristics due to their limited remains. The existence of this clade may indicate that Patagonia, Antarctica and Australia shared the same type of fauna. The exact phylogenetic relationships within this clade could not be identified, except for Gasparinisaura, which proved to be the most basal member of group.

Cladogram based in the phylogenetic analysis of Rozadilla et al., 2016:

See also 

 South Polar region of the Cretaceous
 2016 in paleontology

References 

Ornithopods
Late Cretaceous dinosaurs
Maastrichtian life
Dinosaurs of Antarctica
Fossil taxa described in 2015
Taxa named by Fernando Novas
Ornithischian genera